Tătărăștii de Jos is a commune in Teleorman County, Muntenia, Romania. It is composed of seven villages: Lada, Negreni, Negrenii de Sus, Negrenii-Osebiți, Obârtu, Slăvești and Tătărăștii de Jos.

References

Communes in Teleorman County
Localities in Muntenia